Muhammad Thoriq Husler (19 April 1963 – 24 December 2020) was an Indonesian politician.

Biography
Husler served as the 2nd Regent of East Luwu Regency, located in South Sulawesi province from 17 February 2016, until his death in office on 24 December 2020. He was a member of Golkar.

Husler was born on 19 April 1963, in Palopo, South Sulawesi.

On 9 December 2020, Husler won re-election to a second term as Regent of East Luwu in the local elections. Husler, who ran for re-election with Budiman Hakim as his running mate, received 86,351 votes, or 53% of the vote, in the 2020 election.

In December 2020, during the COVID-19 pandemic in Indonesia, Husler began exhibiting symptoms of COVID-19. He was initially hospitalized at Grestelina Hospital for treatment, before being transferred to Wahidin Hospital in Makassar for several days as his condition worsened. Husler died from the virus at Wahidin Sudirohusodo Hospital in Makassar on 24 December 2020, at the age of 57.

References

1963 births
2020 deaths
Mayors and regents of places in South Sulawesi
Regents of places in Indonesia
Golkar politicians
People from East Luwu Regency
People from Luwu Regency
People from Palopo
Deaths from the COVID-19 pandemic in Indonesia